Stenorhopalus monsalvei is a species of beetle in the family Cerambycidae. It was described by Cerda in 1954.

References

Beetles described in 1954
Necydalinae